The World Business Forum is an annual global business summit held in New York City. A 2008 Burson-Marsteller survey ranked the forum among the world's top five most influential venues for C-Suite executives.

The yearly summit brings together and average of over 5,000 attendees, consisting mostly of senior executives from over 60 countries.  The Forum consists of  discussions of top political leaders, business leaders, and intellectuals about the current issues and challenges of the world business environment and global economy.

History
The World Business Forum in New York City launched in 2004.  Past speakers in the World Business Forum included political figures such as Bill Clinton, Kofi Annan, Rudy Giuliani, Tony Blair and Colin Powell. Other speakers have been CEOs Jack Welch, Richard Branson, Herb Kelleher and John Chambers, financial experts Alan Greenspan and Jeremy Siegel, and management experts Tom Peters, Peter Drucker and Michael Porter among others.

2014 participants
Speakers included:

Ben Bernanke: THE FUTURE OF THE GLOBAL ECONOMY
Robert Redford: A CONVERSATION ON CREATIVITY, TALENT AND THE SEARCH FOR MEANING
Malcolm Gladwell: THE ART OF BATTLING GIANTS
Daniel Gilbert (psychologist): MAKING DECISIONS THAT ARE RIGHT FOR YOU
Sir Ken Robinson: CULTIVATING CREATIVITY
Peter Diamandis: CREATING AN AGE OF ABUNDANCE
Blake Mycoskie: START SOMETHING THAT MATTERS
Ian Bremmer: WINNERS AND LOSERS IN A G-ZERO WORLD
Simon Sinek: WHY LEADERS EAT LAST
Claudio Fernández-Aráoz:  IT’S NOT THE HOW OR THE WHAT BUT THE WHO
Linda Hill: LEVERAGING YOUR ORGANIZATION’S COLLECTIVE GENIUS
Rita McGrath: THE END OF COMPETITIVE ADVANTAGE
Phillipe Starck: CREATIVITY & OPENING THE DOORS OF THE HUMAN BRAIN

2012 participants 
Marcus Buckingham
Jack Welch
Fareed Zakaria
Michael Porter
Lynda Gratton
Robert Gates
Sherry Turkle
Richard Branson
Barbara Corcoran
Mark King
Don Tapscott
Jim Collins

75% of attendees to the World Business Forum are at director level or above, and 30% are C-Suite executives.

Organizer
The event is organized by WOBI, an executive education and management content firm which has been holding business conferences globally for over 20 years under the names World Business Forum and ExpoManagement. In addition to the World Business Forum in New York, WOBI organizes business forums around the world as well as other forums including the WOBI On Innovation.

2019 
This year's World Business Forum will take place from November 20th to November 21st at David H. Koch Theater at Lincoln Center in New York City.

References

External links 
 World Business Forum Homepage
 2012 World Business Forum Agenda
 World Business Forum flickr Photo Gallery
 HSMAmericas / World Business Forum YouTube Channel
 Global HSM Corporate Homepage
 HSM Corporate Blog
 Radio City Music Hall Website
 World of Business Forum

Business conferences